Cimmerites elegans is a species of beetles in the family Carabidae.

References

External links 

 
 Cimmerites elegans at carabidae.org

Trechinae
Beetles described in 1998